Women of Devil's Island is a 1962 Italian-French adventure-drama film written and directed  by Domenico Paolella and starring Guy Madison and Michèle Mercier.

Plot
In the late 18th century, a group of French female convicts - among them streetwalkers, murderers, and revolutionaries -  are shipped to Devil's Island penal colony. They join the other female convicts already on the island and are forced by the cruel Lefèvre and his abusive guards to pan gold for the French king Louis XVI of France and his Austrian queen Marie Antoinette.

Lefèvre hopes for a promotion, but a new prison governor arrives with a letter from the king and takes command, also putting in place a more humane prison regiment for the women. In reality, the letter is a fake. He is the revolutionary Henri Vallière and in league with the pirates, who in a daring coup help him steal the gold and overturn Lefèvre's rule.

Cast 
 
Guy Madison as Henri Vallière 
Michèle Mercier as    Martine Foucher
 Federica Ranchi as Jeanette  
 Marisa Belli as    Melina 
 Paul Muller as   Lefèvre 
 Tullio Altamura as   Dubois 
 Antonella Della Porta as Louise 
 Carlo Hintermann as   Capt. Duval 
 Gisella Arden as Maeva 
 Fernando Piazza as Michael 
 Margaret Rose Keil as Rosy  
 Claudine Damon as Pauline 
 Roldano Lupi

Release
On DVD, the film has been released in the United States by Mill Creek Entertainment on 7 February 2006 as part of the "Drive-In Movie Classics 50 Movie Pack", and in Germany under the title Frauen für die Teufelsinsel in a licensed limited edition with German and English audio.

References

External links

1962 adventure films
Italian adventure films
French adventure films
Films directed by Domenico Paolella
Films set on Devil's Island
Women in prison films
1960s Italian-language films
1960s Italian films
1960s French films